Paralypusa chinensis is a small moth in the family Lypusidae. It was found in eastern China in Zhejiang province.

Taxonomy
It was described by Alexandr L. Lvovsky in 2010 in the genus Pseudatemelia of the family Amphisbatidae as P. chinensis. He reclassified it in a new monotypic genus Paralypusa two years later.

Etymology
The generic name indicates the affinity to the genus Lypusa.

Description
The wingspan is about 10 mm.

References

Moths described in 2010
Lypusidae